The Leather Pushers is a 1940 American comedy action film directed by John Rawlins and starring Andy Devine, Richard Arlen and Astrid Allwyn. It was part of the Aces of Action series with the two stars.

It was based on the series of stories The Leather Pushers. Filming started July 1940.

Plot

Cast
 Richard Arlen as Dick 'Kid' Roberts
 Andy Devine as 	Andy Adams
 Astrid Allwyn as Pat Danbury
 Douglas Fowley as Slick Connolly
 Charles D. Brown as 	J.R. Stevens
 Shemp Howard as Sailor McNeill
 Horace McMahon as Slugger Mears
 Charles Lane as 	Henry 'Mitch' Mitchell
 Wade Boteler as 	Fight Commissioner Dunlap
 George Lloyd as Joe Johnson
 Eddie Gribbon as Pete Manson
 Frank Mitchell as 	Grogan's Manager
 Reid Kilpatrick as Ringside Commentator
 Ben Alexander as Dan Brown, Announcer
 Frances Morris as Nurse

References

External links
The Leather Pushers at IMDb

1940 films
American action films
1940s action films
American black-and-white films
Films directed by John Rawlins
Universal Pictures films
1940s English-language films
1940s American films